Olivia is a feminine given name in the English language. It is derived from Latin oliva, olive. Both Oliva and Olivia were Latinate forms in use in English speaking countries as early as the thirteenth century. Olive was in common use as a vernacular form. Though not invented by William Shakespeare, the name was popularized by a character in the Twelfth Night.

Olivia has been a popular name throughout the English-speaking world since the mid-1990s, and has been one of the most popular given names for baby girls in the United Kingdom for much of that time. In 2021, it topped Babycenter's top 100 and was the third most popular name for girls in Australia. Olivia was the most popular name for girls in both the United States and the United Kingdom in 2020. It has also been among the most popular names for girls in many other European countries, Canada and New Zealand in recent years.

People with the mononym

Olivia of Palermo (448–463), Christian martyr
Olivia (singer) (born 1981), American singer, born Olivia Longott

People with the name

Olivia Alexander (born 1988), American actress
Olivia Allison (born 1990), English swimmer
Olivia Amoako (born 1985), Ghanaian footballer
Olivia Anderson (born 1987), South African cricketer
Olivia Arthur (born 1980), British documentary photographer
Olivia Attwood (born 1991), British TV personality
Olivia Baker (weightlifter) (born 1979), New Zealand weightlifter
Olivia Barash (born 1965), American actress
Olivia Barclay (1919–2001), British astrologer
Olivia Cajero Bedford (1938–2022), American politician
Olivia Bee (born 1994), American photographer
Olivia Bennet, Countess of Tankerville (1830–1922), British countess
Olivia De Berardinis (born 1948), American painter
Olivia Bertrand (born 1989), French alpine skier
Olivia Blake (born 1990), British MP
Olivia Blatchford (born 1993), American squash player
Olivia Bloomfield, Baroness Bloomfield of Hinton Waldrist (born 1960), British political party executive
Olivia Bonamy (born 1972), French actress
Olivia Bonelli (1920–1990), American soprano
Olivia Bonilla (born 1992), American singer-songwriter and actress
Olivia Borlée (born 1986), Belgian sprinter
Olivia Breen (born 1996), British Paralympian athlete
Olivia Broadfield (born 1981), English singer-songwriter
Olivia Broome, British para powerlifter
Olivia Brown (born 1960), American actress
Olivia Bucio (born 1954), Mexican actress
Olivia Buckland (born 1993), English reality television personality and model
Olivia Buckley (1799–1847), English harpist, organist and composer
Olivia Burges (died 1930), British scouting and guiding advocate
Olivia Burnette (born 1977), American actress
Olivia Ward Bush-Banks (1869–1944), African American author
Olivia Carlsson (born 1995), Swedish ice hockey player
Olivia Carnegie-Brown (born 1991), British rower
Olivia Cattan (born 1967), French journalist
Olivia Cenizal (1926–2008), Filipino film actress
Olivia Chance (born 1993), British footballer
Olivia Chaney (born 1982), English folk singer
Olivia Cheng (Hong Kong actress) (born 1960), Hong Kong actress
Olivia Cheng (Canadian actress), Canadian actress and television journalist
Olivia Choong (born 1979), environmental activist from Singapore
Olivia Cîmpian (born 2001), Romanian-born Hungarian female artistic gymnast
Olivia Chow (born 1957), Canadian politician
Olivia Langdon Clemens (1845–1901), wife of Mark Twain
Olivia Coffey (born 1989), American rower
Olivia Cole (1942–2018), American actress
Olivia Cole (poet) (born 1981), British poet
Olivia Colman (born 1974), British actress
Olivia Coolidge (1908–2006), American writer and educator
Olivia Cooke (born 1993), English actress
Olivia Côte, French actress
Olivia Crocicchia (born 1995), American actress
Olivia Culpo (born 1992), American beauty pageant titleholder who won Miss USA and Miss Universe 2012
Olivia d'Abo (born 1969), British actress, singer and songwriter
Olivia Dean (born 1999), English singer
Olivia Deeble (born 2002), Australian actress
Olivia DeJonge (born 1998), Australian actress
Olivia DeMerchant (born 1991), Canadian rugby union player
Olivia Mariamne Devenish (1771–1814), British socialite
Olivia De Berardinis (born 1948), American artist
Olive Duck (1912–1925), American female murder victim
Olivia Dunne (born 2002), American gymnast and internet personality
Olivia Gant (2010–2017), American female murder victim
Olivia Goldsmith (1949–2004), American writer
Olivia Harrison (born 1948), wife of musician George Harrison
Olivia Hallinan (born 1985), English actress
Olivia de Havilland (1916–2020), British-American actress
Olivia Holt (born 1997), American actress
Olivia Hooker (1915–2018), American psychologist
Olivia Hussey (born 1951), British actress
Olivia Hye (born Son Hye-ju, 2001), Korean musician
Olivia Jordan (born 1988), American beauty pageant titleholder
Olivia Judson (born 1970), British biologist
Olivia Liang (born 1993), American actress
Olivia Lufkin (born 1979), Japanese-American singer known mononymously as Olivia
Olivia Manning (1908–1980), British writer
Olivia Alaina May (born 1985), American actress
Olivia McTaggart (born 2000), New Zealand pole vault athlete
Olivia Munn (born 1980), American actress
Olivia Newton-John (1948–2022), English-born Australian singer and actress
Olivia Nordgren (1880–1969), Swedish politician
Olivia Nuzzi (born 1993), American political journalist
Olivia O'Leary (born 1949), Irish journalist
Olivia Olson (born 1992), American actress and singer
Olivia Ong (born 1985), Singaporean singer
Olivia Reeves (born 2003), American weightlifter
Olivia Rodrigo (born 2003), American actress and singer
Olivia Ruiz (born 1980), French singer
Olivia Tennet (born 1991), New Zealand actress
Olivia Trappeniers (born 1997), Belgian Flemish singer, also known as OT and by the mononym Olivia
Olivia Thirlby (born 1986), American actress
Olivia Ulenius (born 2007), Finnish footballer
Olivia Wayne (born 1986), British sports journalist and television presenter
Olivia Wensley (born 1985), New Zealand lawyer
Olivia Wilde (born 1984), American actress
Olivia Williams (born 1968), English actress

Animals with the name
Olivia (dog) (born 2015), dog actor

Fictional characters with the name
Olivia, in Shakespeare's play Twelfth Night
 Olivia, in Fire Emblem Awakening
 Olivia, in Minecraft: Story Mode
Olivia, in Buffy the Vampire Slayer
Olivia, protagonist of several children's books by Ian Falconer
Olivia, from Pokémon Sun and Moon
Olivia, in the manga series Asobi Asobase
 Olivia, from the animated series Oggy and the Cockroaches
Olivia, from Lego Friends
Olivia, King Olly's sister in Paper Mario: The Origami King
 Lady Olivia, character from the American animated fantasy series Amphibia
 Olivia Adler, main character in "Small Spaces" - first in the book series trilogy "Small Spaces" by Katherine Arden
 Olivia Baker, in the Netflix series 13 Reasons Why
 Olivia Barber Winters, on the American soap opera The Young and the Restless
Olivia Benford, on FlashForward, played by Sonya Walger
Olivia Benson, on Law & Order: Special Victims Unit, played by Mariska Hargitay
Olivia Burke, in the television series Gossip Girl
 Olivia Caliban, from A Series of Unfortunate Events
Olivia Castle, from the horror movie Final Destination 5
Olivia Davidson, from the Sweet Valley High book series
Olivia Dunham, in the television series Fringe
Olivia Falconeri, from the long-running American soap opera General Hospital
Olivia Flaversham, from the 1986 Disney animated film The Great Mouse Detective
Olivia Fuller, from Family Guy
Olivia Harper, in the American comedy-drama Grey's Anatomy
Olivia Johnson, from Hollyoaks
Olivia Kidney, in the Olivia Kidney book series by Ellen Potter
Olivia Lawrence, from the Video Senshi Laserion anime TV series
Olivia Mann, in video game Team Fortress 2
Olivia Pope, in the television series Scandal
Olivia Richards, from the American soap opera Sunset Beach
Olivia Robinson, played by Alaina Reed on the long-running children's series Sesame Street
Olivia Spencer, from the long-running American soap opera Guiding Light
Olivia the Pig, from the popular book series and kids TV show Olivia The Pig
Olivia Webster, Oscar Webster's daughter in the "Violet Evergarden" anime Netflix series
Olivia White, in Lemonade Mouth, played by Bridgit Mendler

Translations 
Arabic: أوليفيا
Bengali: অলিভিয়া
Bulgarian: Оливия
Burmese: အိုလံပစ်
Georgian: ოლივია
Greek: ολίβια
Hindi: ओलिविया
Japanese: オリビア
Korean: 올리비아
Persian: اولیویا
Polish: Oliwia
Russian: Оливия
Tamil: ஒலிவியா
Telugu: ఒలివియా
Thai: โอลิเวีย
Ukrainian: олівія

References 

English feminine given names
English-language feminine given names
Feminine given names
Given names derived from plants or flowers